Daymara Lescay (born 5 September 1992) is a Cuban female volleyball player. She is a member of the Cuba women's national volleyball team and played for Guantanamo in 2014.

She was part of the Cuban national team at the 2010 FIVB Volleyball Women's World Championship, and the 2014 FIVB Volleyball Women's World Championship in Italy.

Clubs
  Guantanamo (2014)

References

1992 births
Living people
Cuban women's volleyball players
Place of birth missing (living people)
Volleyball players at the 2011 Pan American Games
Volleyball players at the 2015 Pan American Games
Pan American Games silver medalists for Cuba
Pan American Games medalists in volleyball
Middle blockers
Medalists at the 2011 Pan American Games